The  (CSM, Superior Naval Council) was an advisory body to the Minister of the Navy that was formed on 5 December 1889. "The CSM advised the minister on the military characteristics of new designs and drew up the staff requirements including displacement, offensive/defensive qualities, speed and endurance."

Citations

Bibliography

French Navy
French military staff
French Third Republic
1889 establishments in France